Eutropha is a genus of flies in the family Chloropidae.

References

Europe
Nearctic

Chloropinae
Chloropidae genera